is an arcade video game developed by Konami and released in 1983. It was licensed to Gottlieb in the United States. Juno First is a fixed shooter with a slightly tilted perspective, similar to Nintendo's Radar Scope from 1980. The game was ported to the Commodore 64, Atari 8-bit family, MSX, IBM PC,  and IBM PCjr.

Gameplay

Juno First presents a set number of enemies per level, but they do not make a gallery formation like Galaga or Space Invaders. Instead, the player's ship can move forward and backward (in addition to left and right) to hunt enemies in an orientation that is vertical, but has some horizon-oriented tilt. This style of gameplay would be re-used in a later Konami shooter, Axelay.

The player destroys waves of enemies to finish levels. Starting formations vary from stage to stage. In addition, the player can pick up a humanoid, upon which the screen will have a red tint. While this happens, every enemy the player shoots will earn the player 200 more points than the previous enemy destroyed. The original score for shooting an enemy while in humanoid mode depends on the stage.

Ports
Juno First was first ported in the western market to the Commodore 64 in 1983. In 1984, Atari 8-bit family and IBM PC/IBM PCjr conversions were also released. All of these ports were handled by Datasoft. The Commodore and Atari ports were programmed by Greg Hiscott, whereas the IBM version was programmed by Scott Titus.

In Japan, Sony released a conversion of Juno First in 1983 for MSX computers. This version soon made its way to other MSX markets as well.

Legacy
An unofficial hobbyist port—with the same name as the original—was made available for the Atari 2600.

See also
Beamrider (1983)

References

External links

 
 Juno First at Arcade History

1983 video games
Arcade video games
Atari 8-bit family games
Commodore 64 games
Datasoft games
Fixed shooters
Konami arcade games
Konami games
MSX games
Video games developed in Japan